Robyn Boak (born 13 April 1955) is a former Australian sprinter. During the 1974 British Commonwealth Games in Christchurch, she won a gold medal in the 4 × 100 metres relay, and also competed in the 200 metres event.

References

1955 births
Living people
20th-century Australian women
21st-century Australian women
21st-century Australian people
Athletes (track and field) at the 1974 British Commonwealth Games
Australian female sprinters
Commonwealth Games gold medallists for Australia
Sportswomen from Victoria (Australia)
Commonwealth Games medallists in athletics
Medallists at the 1974 British Commonwealth Games